Tetu may refer to:

Places 

 Tetu Constituency, an electoral constituency in Kenya
 Tetu, Kenya, an administrative division in Nyeri County, Kenya
 Tetu Lake, a lake of Ontario, Canada.

Other uses 
 Têtu, a French gay magazine
 a Marathi name for Oroxylum indicum

 Tetu Nakamura, a Japanese film actor